John Malcolm Lister (born 9 March 1947) is a professional golfer from New Zealand.

Golf career
Lister was one of the leading players on the Australia and New Zealand circuits during the 1970s. Between 1972 and 1977, he was the leading player on the New Zealand Tour winning ten of twenty-five events. He won the Garden City Classic four consecutive times (1972–1975). His four consecutive wins in a professional tour event is a record that he shares with Tiger Woods, who won the Bay Hill Invitational from 2000–2003.

Lister also enjoyed success around the world. In 1970, he won twice on the British PGA circuit and finished the season in fourth place on the Order of Merit. At the end of the year he qualified for the PGA Tour. He played on the PGA Tour from 1971 until 1982, where he had 15 top-10 finishes in 12 seasons, including a win at the 1976 Ed McMahon-Jaycees Quad Cities Open, the first international player to win this tournament. His best finish in a major championship was in the 1971 Open Championship, where he tied for 25th place.

Personal life 
Lister's older brother, Tom, is a former rugby union player who represented New Zealand.

Professional wins (14)

PGA Tour wins (1)

PGA Tour of Australasia wins (9)

PGA Tour of Australasia playoff record (1–1)

British PGA circuit wins (2)
1970 Piccadilly Medal, Gallaher Ulster Open

New Zealand circuit wins (2)
1971 New Zealand PGA Championship
1972 Garden City Classic

Results in major championships 

CUT = missed the halfway cut
"T" indicates a tie for a place.

Source:

Team appearances
World Cup (representing New Zealand): 1969, 1970, 1971

See also 

 1970 PGA Tour Qualifying School graduates

References

External links

New Zealand male golfers
PGA Tour golfers
Sportspeople from Canterbury, New Zealand
People from Temuka
1947 births
Living people